The 2021 Hankook 12 Hours of Hungary was the 7th running of the 12 Hours of Hungary which took place on 2 and 3 October 2021. It was the sixth round of the 2021 24H GT and TCE Series. The event replaced the 2021 edition of the Coppa Florio on the 24H Series calendar.

Schedule

Entry list
16 cars were entered into the event; 11 GT cars and 5 TCEs.

Results

Qualifying
Fastest in class in bold.

Race

Part 1
Class winner in bold.

Part 2
Class winner in bold.

References

External links

12 Hours of Hungary
12 Hours of Hungary
2021 in 24H Series